Castle Attack was a professional wrestling event promoted by New Japan Pro-Wrestling (NJPW). The event took place on February 27 and 28, 2021 in Osaka, Osaka at Osaka-jō Hall.

The event featured 12 matches across both days. The first day saw Kazuchika Okada defeating Evil in the main event with other prominent matches including Jay White defeating Tomohiro Ishii. The second day main event saw Kota Ibushi successfully defend the IWGP Intercontinental Championship against Tetsuya Naito, making this the first time the IWGP Intercontinental Championship was defended separately from the IWGP Heavyweight Championship since Wrestle Kingdom 14. Other matches on the card for the second day included El Desperado defeating El Phantasmo and Bushi to win the vacant IWGP Junior Heavyweight Championship, which the title was vacated by former champion Hiromu Takahashi after suffering a shoulder injury (Takahashi was originally scheduled to defend the title against El Phantasmo at the event). Hiroshi Tanahashi also successfully defended the NEVER Openweight Championship against Great-O-Khan.

Production

Background 
Since 2020, NJPW has unable to run events with a full arena capacity due to COVID-19 restrictions. The New Beginning is NJPW's first major show after their annual January 4 Tokyo Dome Show, which is their biggest show of the year. On December 25, NJPW announced Castle Attack for February 27 and 28, 2021.

Storylines 
Castle Attack featured twelve professional wrestling matches across both days that involve different wrestlers from pre-existing scripted feuds and storylines. Wrestlers portray villains, heroes, or less distinguishable characters in the scripted events that build tension and culminate in a wrestling match or series of matches.

Since New Year Dash!!, Kazuchika Okada has been asking for a match with Evil. On night two of The New Beginning in Hiroshima, Okada teamed with Toru Yano to take on Evil and Dick Togo but the match ended due to a double countout as Evil attacked Okada outside of the ring with a steel chair. After the match, Okada asked for an impromptu match with Evil which he accepted; although the match ended by disqualification after inference by Togo. NJPW later announced a rematch between Okada and Evil was scheduled for Castle Attack.

After winning the IWGP Heavyweight Championship and IWGP Intercontinental Championship from Tetsuya Naito at Wrestle Kingdom 15, Kota Ibushi declared that he wants to unify the championships into one belt. At The New Beginning in Hiroshima, Ibushi made his first successful defence for both championships against Sanada. After the match, Naito came out and challenged Ibushi for the IWGP Intercontinental Championship; stating that since he lost at Wrestle Kingdom 15 that he feel that he doesn't has the right to challenge for both championships but he doesn't want Ibushi to unify the titles, deciding to only challenge for the Intercontinental Championship; Ibushi accepted Naito's challenge. The match was scheduled for Castle Attack.

Hiromu Takahashi was originally scheduled to face El Phantasmo for the IWGP Junior Heavyweight Championship, but on February 22, it was learned that Takahashi suffered a left pectoral tear, which will leave him out of action for six months. On February 25, Takahashi vacated the championship, and a three-way match between El Phantasmo, El Desperado, and Bushi for the vacant title was announced.

Results

Night 1 (February 27)

Night 2 (February 28)

See also
 2021 in professional wrestling
 List of major NJPW events

References

External links 
 Official New Japan Pro-Wrestling's website

February 2021 events in Japan
2021 in professional wrestling
New Japan Pro-Wrestling shows
Events in Osaka